William Ward Preston (April 20, 1932 – January 17, 2016) was an American production designer and art director. He was nominated for an Academy Award in the category Best Art Direction for the film The Towering Inferno.

Selected filmography
 The Towering Inferno (1974)

References

External links

1932 births
2016 deaths
American art directors
American production designers